The São Paulo WCT was a men's tennis tournament played in São Paulo, Brazil from 1974–1976.  The event was part of the WCT Tour and was held on indoor carpet courts.

Past finals

Singles

Doubles

See also
 ATP São Paulo

References

World Championship Tennis
Defunct tennis tournaments in Brazil
Recurring sporting events established in 1974
Recurring sporting events disestablished in 1976
1974 establishments in Brazil
1976 disestablishments in Brazil